Modicogryllini is a tribe of crickets (Orthoptera: Ensifera) of the family Gryllidae.  Species are terrestrial, carnivorous or omnivorous and can be found in all continenents except Antarctica.

Genera
The Orthoptera Species File lists:

 Acophogryllus Gorochov, 1996 
 monotypic A. schultzei (Gorochov, 1996)
 Angolagryllus Otte, 1994 
 monotypic A. macrocephala (Otte, 1987)
 Apedina Otte & Alexander, 1983
 Apterocryncus Gorochov, 1990
 monotypic A. martini (Bolívar, 1900)
 Aritella Otte & Alexander, 1983
 Astrupia Otte, 1987
 Cyrtoprosopus Chopard, 1951
 monotypic C. stramineus Chopard, 1951
 Eumodicogryllus Gorochov, 1986
 Geogryllus Otte & Perez-Gelabert, 2009
 Gryllopsis Chopard, 1928
 Kazuemba de Mello, 1990
 monotypic K. walderi de Mello, 1990
 Lepidogryllus Otte & Alexander, 1983
 Mitius Gorochov, 1985
 Modicogryllus Chopard, 1961 - type genus
 Modicoides Otte & Cade, 1984
 monotypic M. royi (Chopard, 1954)
 Mombasina Otte, 1987
 monotypic M. rufulus (Chopard, 1932)
 Nimbagryllus Otte, 1987
 Pictorina Otte & Alexander, 1983
 Rufocephalus Otte & Alexander, 1983
 Svercacheta Gorochov, 1993
 monotypic S. siamensis (Chopard, 1961)
 Tugainus Gorochov, 1986
 monotypic T. dreuxi (Chopard, 1966)
 Tumpalia Otte & Alexander, 1983
 Velarifictorus Randell, 1964

References

External links
 

Orthoptera tribes
Gryllinae